Mangatoki is a locality in southern Taranaki,  in New Zealand's North Island. Eltham is to the east, Kaponga to the west and Matapu to the south. The Mangatoki Stream runs from Mount Taranaki through the area and into the Waingongoro River.

Demographics

Mangatoki is part of the Kaponga-Mangatoki statistical area.

Education
Te Kura o Nga Ruahine Rangi is a coeducational composite (years 1-15) school with a roll of  students as of  It started as a private school in Awatuna about 1996. At the beginning of 2008 it moved to the grounds of the former Mangatoki School and became a fully funded state school with "special character" status.

Mangatoki School was a primary school which opened in 1891 and closed in 2005.

Notes

Further reading

General historical works

Business

School

Populated places in Taranaki
South Taranaki District